This list of Baptist denominations in India is a list of subdivisions of Baptists, with their various Baptist associations, conferences, conventions, fellowships, groups, and unions in India.

List of denominations
Ao Baptist Arogo Mungdang (Ao Baptist Churches Convention)
Angami Baptist Church Council
Apatani Christian Fellowship
Arunachal Baptist Church Council
Assam Baptist Convention
Baptist Convention Coastal Andhra
Baptist Christian Association
Baptist Church of Mizoram
Baptist Union of North India
Bengal Baptist Fellowship
Bengal Orissa Bihar Baptist Convention
Boro Baptist Church Association
Boro Baptist Convention
Chang Baptist Lashong Thangyen (Chang Baptist Churches Association)
Council of Baptist Churches in Northeast India
Council of Baptist Churches in Northern India
Convention of Baptist Churches of the Northern Circars
Evangelical Baptist Convention of India
Faith Gospel Preaching Church, Hyderabad, India
Garo Baptist Convention
Gospel Association of India
India Association of General Baptists
 Independent Gospel Baptist Churches And The Associated Missions
Independent Baptist Ministries of India, Chathannoor kerala (Independent Baptist Churches)
Karbi-Anglong Baptist Convention
Karnataka Baptist Convention
Kuki Baptist Convention
Lower Assam Baptist Union
Maharashtra Baptist Society
Manipur Baptist Convention
Nagaland Baptist Church Council
Faith Baptist Mission
Nyishi Baptist Church Council
North Bank Baptist Christian Association
Orissa Baptist Evangelical Crusade
Rabha Baptist Church Union
Samavesam of Telugu Baptist Churches
Sadar North Baptist Association
Separate Baptists in Christ
Seventh Day Baptist Church
Tamil Baptist Churches
Tripura Baptist Christian Union of India

. Missionary Baptist Churches in Kerala
.  Missionary Baptist Association of India 
List of Baptist denominations
List of Christian denominations in India
List of Christian denominations in North East India

Denominations in India
Baptist denominations in India
Denominations
Baptist denominations
Baptist